The Philippine House Committee on Visayas Development, or House Visayas Development Committee is a standing committee of the Philippine House of Representatives.

Jurisdiction 
As prescribed by House Rules, the committee's jurisdiction is on the policies, programs and related initiatives affecting the economic, social, political and cultural development of municipalities, cities and provinces in the Visayas region including needs, concerns and issues that impact on the welfare of constituencies therein.

Members, 18th Congress

See also 
 House of Representatives of the Philippines
 List of Philippine House of Representatives committees

References

External links 
House of Representatives of the Philippines

Visayas Development
Visayas